Fear of commitment, also known as gamophobia, is the irrational fear or avoidance of long-term partnership or marriage. The term is sometimes used interchangeably with commitment phobia, which describes a generalized fear or avoidance of commitments more broadly.

History 
The term "commitmentphobia" was coined in the popular self-help book Men Who Can't Love in 1987. Following criticism that the idea was sexist, implying only men were commitmentphobic, the authors provided a more gender balanced model of commitmentphobia in a later work,  He's Scared, She's Scared (1995). When aversion to marriage involves fear, it's called "scottophobia". Hatred of marriage is "misogamy".

Criticism 
Besides the common criticisms of self-help, psychologist Bella M. DePaulo has written books on singlism such as Singlism: What it is, why it matters and how to stop it and Singled Out on the stigmatization of single people.

The use of the term "fear" or "phobia" imparts an inherent linguistic bias. It recasts specific lifestyle decisions (such as bachelorhood vs. marriage, or a conscious decision to remain childfree) implicitly as generalised, irrational phobias while failing to identify, describe or address an individual's specific motives. For instance, the men's rights movement, citing high divorce rates and expensive alimony and legal costs, does speak not in terms of a "fear of commitment" but of a "marriage strike" to reflect their position that non-marriage is an entirely valid, logical position based on rational consideration of the economic factors involved.

See also
 Alimony
 Bachelor
 Child custody
 Divorce
 Implications of divorce
 Lad culture
 Old maid
 Sexual revolution

References

Marriage
Interpersonal relationships
Divorce
Intimate relationships
Phobias